Julie Frølund Funch (born 6 February 1997) is a Danish canoeist. She competed in the women's K-2 500 metres and the K-4 500 metres  events at the 2020 Summer Olympics.

References

External links
 

1997 births
Living people
Danish female canoeists
Canoeists at the 2020 Summer Olympics
Olympic canoeists of Denmark
European Games competitors for Denmark
Canoeists at the 2019 European Games